Condover is a civil parish in Shropshire, England.  It contains 96 listed buildings that are recorded in the National Heritage List for England.  Of these, two are listed at Grade I, the highest of the three grades, three are at Grade II*, the middle grade, and the others are at Grade II, the lowest grade.  The parish contains the villages of Condover, Dorrington, Great Ryton, and Stapleton, and smaller settlements, but is mainly rural.  Most of the listed buildings are houses, cottages, farmhouses and farm buildings, the earliest of which are timber framed, some with cruck construction.  The most important building in the parish is the country house Condover Hall; this and associated structures are listed.  The other listed buildings include churches and items in the churchyards, bridges, public houses, and a war memorial.


Key

Buildings

Notes and references

Notes

Citations

Sources

Lists of buildings and structures in Shropshire